is a Japanese professional wrestler best known under the ring name Sareee. She was most recently signed to WWE, where she performed on the NXT brand under the ring name Sarray.

She was trained by Kyoko Inoue and made her debut in April 2011 at the age of 15. She worked for World Woman Pro-Wrestling Diana for six years, before transferring to Seadlinnng in February 2017. After leaving Seadlinnng in September, she returned to Diana, where she competed until January 2020.

Professional wrestling career

World Woman Pro-Wrestling Diana (2011–2017) 

Fujimura initially wanted to join NEO Japan Ladies Pro-Wrestling, but instead opted to train under Kyoko Inoue after she left the promotion in July 2010. While training under Inoue, she also took some extra training in Animal Hamaguchi's dojo under Kyoko Hamaguchi. On February 10, 2011, Inoue signed Sari to her new World Woman Pro-Wrestling Diana promotion as a trainee. She was given the ring name Sareee on March 3, which combined her birth name with the name of the band Greeeen, of which she was a fan. She was originally set to make her debut on Diana's debut show on March 21, 2011, however, due to the effects of the Great East Japan Earthquake and the Fukushima nuclear accident, Diana's first show in Fukushima was cancelled and her debut was postponed until April. She made her debut on April 14, 2011, losing to Meiko Satomura. On May 10, she was selected to face Joshi puroresu legend Aja Kong one on one at Kawasaki City Gymnasium. Despite losing, she kicked out of Kong's vertical drop brainbuster finisher, garnering a large reaction from the crowd. On September 4, she gained her first indirect victory, teaming with Kyoko Inoue to beat Kong and Andrea Mother at a Hikaru produced show. She finally achieved her first singles victory on April 20, 2012, beating Nana Kawasa. On January 28, 2013, she got her first title shot, teaming with Inoue in a loss to Kaoru Ito and Tomoko Watanbe for the vacant Diana Tag Team Championship.

On April 20, 2014, she won her first championship, beating Manami Katsu for the JWP Junior Championship and Princess of Pro-Wrestling Championship. She made one successful defence against Kaho Kobayashi, before dropping the belt to Rabbit Miu on August 17. On October 5, she competed in the biggest match of her career to that point, challenging Manami Toyota for the Diana World Championship. After a 20-minute match, Sareee was defeated. On December 23, she and Jaguar Yokota won the Diana Tag Team Championship, beating Kaoru and Mima Shimoda. Sareee and Yokota held the titles until February 2015, when Sareee announced she would be going on an indefinite hiatus due to poor health. She continued competing until April, when she and Yokota successfully defended the belts against Command Bolshoi and Eri, after which, she became inactive and the championships were vacated. After two months away, Sareee returned to the ring on June 28 at Jaguar Yokota's 38th Anniversary Show, teaming with Manami Toyota and Kaoru Ito in a loss to Yumiko Hotta, Mima Shimoda and Meiko Tanaka. On September 16, Sareee had a chance to win the Diana Tag Team Championship back with new partner Meiko Tanaka, but the two were unsuccessful and the vacant titles were won by Dash Chisako and Sendai Sachiko. Despite losing, Sareee and Tanaka became a regular team, and on December 25 defeated Kaho Kobayashi and Rina Yamashita to win Pro Wrestling Wave's Young Oh! Oh! Tag Team Tournament. Two days later at Diana's 40th dojo show, she won a one night tournament, beating Mima Shimoda in the final. On May 5, she main evented Diana's Korakuen Hall show, losing to Seadlinnng's Yoshiko in her 5th anniversary match. The following month, she entered Wave's Catch the Wave tournament, but was eliminated in the quarter final by Tsukasa Fujimoto.

Seadlinnng (2017) 
After six years with Diana, Sareee announced she would leave the promotion and transfer to Seadlinnng on February 1, 2017. Sareee debuted for Sead on March 16, 2017, losing to Yoshiko. After seven months she announced she would leave the promotion in September.

Return to Diana (2018–2020) 

Immediately after leaving Seadlinnng, Sareee announced she would return to Diana on September 18, 2017. Sareee returned to Diana on October 20, 2017, losing to Kaoru Ito. During the match, she sustained a clavicle injury, and was expected to miss over a year of competition due to the injury. After just 3 months, Sareee returned to the ring on January 28, 2018, teaming with Ito in a loss to Kyoko Inoue and Manami Katsu. Throughout early 2018, Sareee began her ascent to the main event of Diana, and challenged Kyoko Inoue for the Diana World Championship in the main event of the Diana 7th Anniversary Memorial Show on May 5, 2018.

Despite losing, Sareee immediately demanded a rematch, which Inoue granted and was set up for July. In the rematch on July 22 in Kawasaki, Sareee defeated Kyoko Inoue to win the Diana World Championship for the first time. In her first defence on December 20, Sareee lost the title to Aja Kong. On January 6, 2019, she challenged and lost to Chihiro Hashimoto for the Sendai Girls World Championship. On February 11, she lost to Aja Kong in their rematch. On May 12 in Korakuen Hall, she finally defeated Kong in their third match to become a two time Diana World Champion. Later in the month, she called out Hashimoto to put both of their championships up in a double title match. Hashimoto agreed, and the match took place on June 8, 2019, with Sareee winning and claiming both the Diana World Championship and Sendai Girls World Championship. Sareee made her first successful defence on July 7, beating Dash Chisako in Korakuen Hall. Sareee lost the Sendai Championship on October 13 to Hashimoto, ending her reign at 127 days. On January 4, 2020, Sareee lost her Diana Championship to Ayako Sato, ending her second reign at 237 days. Sareee announced she will leave Diana in February, as she was heading to the United States.

WWE (2020–2023) 
On February 22, 2020, during a Diana show, Sareee confirmed that she had signed with WWE. Her move to the United States was delayed by the COVID-19 pandemic, causing a change in her move schedule. Because of this, WWE allowed her to continue working date in Japan until she could move to the United States. On August 30, Sareee made her return to the Japanese independent scene with Diana, wrestling Nagisa Nozaki to a ten-minute time limit draw. She briefly held Seadlinnng's Beyond the Sea Tag Team Championship with Yoshiko before losing them to Arisa Nakajima and Nanae Takahashi on January 22, 2021, which was Sarreee's final match on the indies. On the March 17, 2021, episode of NXT, she was given the new ring name Sarray. She made her debut on the April 20 episode of NXT, where she defeated Zoey Stark. On the August 10 episode of NXT, Sarray suffered her first loss against Dakota Kai. She made an appearance on the October 8 episode of 205 Live and defeated Amari Miller.

On the January 18, 2022, episode of NXT, a vignette aired of Sarray sporting pigtails and dressed in a schoolgirl uniform, explaining that 2021 didn't turn out as she hoped it would. She returned to Japan to physically and mentally heal herself, and came across a medallion she got from her grandma, reminding her of where she came from and that she would return to NXT with "new passion and energy". Sarray made her in-ring return on the February 1 episode of NXT, where upon making her entrance she appeared backstage wearing the clothing she wore in her return promotional vignette, then entered the ring area dressed in a new wrestling outfit and a different hair style thanks to her grandmother's medallion with transforming powers, defeating Kayla Inlay. On the February 25 episode of NXT Level Up, she lost in a match against Elektra Lopez. In March, Sarray started a feud with Tiffany Stratton after being attacked by her for rejecting her offer to replace her grandmother's necklace with one that she would give to her, this led them to a match on the March 15 episode of NXT, where Stratton prevented Sarray from transforming and defeated her. Two weeks later, a transformed Sarray distracted Stratton and caused her to lose in a match against Ivy Nile. On the April 19 episode of NXT, Sarray fought Stratton in another losing effort. On the May 10 episode of NXT, Sarray teamed with Andre Chase and defeated the team of Stratton and Grayson Waller in a mixed tag team match. On the June 23 episode of NXT UK, Sarray made her debut on the brand, defeating Nina Samuels.

On March 9, 2023 it was reported Sarray would leave WWE and she will be returning to Japan in May. She confirmed her departure on March 13.

Other media 
Fujimura made her video game debut in The Whole Dam Pack DLC for WWE 2K22.

Championships and accomplishments 
 
 JWP Joshi Puroresu
 JWP Junior Championship (1 time)
 Princess of Pro-Wrestling Championship (1 time)
 Pro Wrestling Wave
 Young OH! OH! Tag Team Tournament (2015) – with Meiko Tanaka
 Dual Shock Wave Tournament (2020) – with Hibiki
 Seadlinnng
 Beyond the Sea Tag Team Championship (1 time) – with Yoshiko
 Sendai Girls' Pro Wrestling
 Sendai Girls World Championship (1 time)
 World Woman Pro-Wrestling Diana
 World Woman Pro-Wrestling Diana World Championship (2 times)
 World Woman Pro-Wrestling Diana Tag Team Championship (1 time) – with Jaguar Yokota
 One Night Tournament (2015)

References

External links 

 
 
 
 

Living people
1996 births
People from Tokyo
Expatriate professional wrestlers
Japanese expatriate sportspeople in the United States
Japanese female professional wrestlers
21st-century professional wrestlers